Jukka Halme (born 29 May 1985) is a Finnish footballer who plays as a midfielder for HIFK.

Club career
Halme has played for HIFK in three highest tiers of Finnish football; Veikkausliiga, Ykkönen and Kakkonen. He made his Veikkausliiga debut in 2015 season opener against IFK Mariehamn. Halme has also played for PK-35 Vantaa. He was also the vice-captain of HIFK, commonly captaining the team in absence of Esa Terävä.

References

1985 births
Living people
Finnish footballers
Veikkausliiga players
HIFK Fotboll players
Käpylän Pallo players
Association football midfielders
Footballers from Helsinki
21st-century Finnish people